The Primetime Emmy Award for Outstanding Picture Editing for a Structured or Competition Reality Program is awarded to one program each year. This category and Outstanding Picture Editing for a Structured or Competition Reality Program were created in 2016, replacing Outstanding Picture Editing for Reality Programming. Prior to 2006, reality programs competed alongside nonfiction programs in Picture Editing for a Nonfiction Program.

In the following list, the first titles listed in gold are the winners; those not in gold are nominees, which are listed in alphabetical order. The years given are those in which the ceremonies took place:

Winners and nominations

2000s
Outstanding Picture Editing for a Structured or Competition Reality Program

2010s

Outstanding Picture Editing for an Unstructured Reality Program

2020s

Programs with multiple wins

5 wins
Deadliest Catch

2 wins
 Life Below Zero
 United Shades of America with W. Kamau Bell

Programs with multiple nominations
Totals include nominations for Outstanding Picture Editing for a Nonfiction Program.

16 nominations
 Deadliest Catch

7 nominations
 Born This Way

6 nominations
 Life Below Zero

4 nominations
 RuPaul's Drag Race: Untucked

2 nominations
 Cheer
 United Shades of America with W. Kamau Bell

References

Picture Editing for an Unstructured Reality Program